"Hold Me Tight" is a song written and performed by Johnny Nash.    It was featured on his 1968 album Hold Me Tight, was arranged by Arthur Jenkins and produced by Jenkins and Nash.

The single's B-side, "Cupid", reached #6 on the UK Singles Chart, #38 on the adult contemporary chart, and #39 on the U.S. pop chart in 1969.

Chart performance
"Hold Me Tight" reached #1 on the Canadian chart.  In the US, it went to #5 on the Billboard Hot 100 and #7 on the Cash Box Top 100 as well as #20 on the adult contemporary chart.  It peaked at #21 on the U.S. R&B chart and #5 in the UK Singles Chart, all in 1968.
The song ranked #37 on Billboard magazine's Top 100 singles of 1968 and #47 in Canada.

Other charting versions
Johnny Carver - as a single in 1969 which reached #32 on the U.S. country chart.
Ali Campbell - as a single in 2007 which reached #140 on the UK Singles Chart.

Popular culture
The tune was also used in Score commercials.

References

1968 songs
1968 singles
1969 singles
2007 singles
Johnny Nash songs
Chet Atkins songs
Hank Snow songs
Wanda Jackson songs
Skeeter Davis songs
Anne Murray songs
Song recordings produced by Richard Gottehrer
Song recordings produced by Chips Moman
Song recordings produced by Chet Atkins
Song recordings produced by Jim Ed Norman
RPM Top Singles number-one singles
Songs written by Johnny Nash